Reutum is a village in the Dutch province of Overijssel. It is a part of the municipality of Tubbergen, and lies about 10 km northwest of Oldenzaal.

Reutum was first attested in the late-10th century as Riatnon, and means "settlement near reed". The village developed along the Reutumse Es. Reutum and neighbour  were home to 670 people in 1840.

The church is dedicated to St. Simon and Judas, and was constructed in 1811. The windmill is called "De Vier Winden" (The four winds), and dates from 1862. Another point of interest is the double sluice in the Almelo-Nordhorn canal.

Notable people 
 Bart Groothuis (born 1981), politician

Gallery

References

Populated places in Overijssel
Tubbergen